Claremont Square is a square in the Angel (Pentonville) part of Islington, London. Its central green mound, hiding a reservoir, is dotted with mature trees on all four sides (embankments). On its north side is Pentonville Road. It is lined on the south, east and west sides by early-nineteenth-century houses, and on the north side, across the arterial road, by heavily recessed apartment/office buildings.  Many of the houses have been internally subdivided.

Landscaped small reservoir

The New River Company constructed a forerunner to today's covered reservoir, Upper Pond, in 1709. Water was pumped up to the Upper Pond from New River Head. In 1855, the Upper Pond was drained, deepened and lined with tall walls, all buffered by tree-lined embankments. The natural views and much-buried walls of the structure mean it was Grade II listed in 2000. It is in use as part of London's inner Ring Main.  Thames Water have exclusive access and take charge of repairs, cutting and planting, assisted by volunteer projects and residents' information. The street-side railings have a mixed set of pointed finials and form a neat, paradigmal archetype so are listed.

Well off the south-east corner lay the former stables and stablemen's families homes (mews) which, demolished to become a close, on land taken from gardens, have been turned into a green circus (garden square) with 48 purpose-built flats.

Architecture
The buildings that line all but the north side were built from 1815 to 1828. Much repaired, they have ornate brick dressings to windows and dividing storeys, with some use of white stucco and cornices, with original street-side railings. They form №s 2 to 44 – listed grade II.

TV and Film 
The Harry Potter film series uses the square as 12 Grimmauld Place. The Square is also the filming location for 35 Portland Row in the Netflix adaption of Lockwood & Co.

External links
 British Listed Buildings Entry for Claremont Square
 Detailed description of the square with old photographs and drawings
 http://www.londongardenstrust.org/guides/site.php?tour=Islington&stage=15.00
 https://lightscameraislington.com/2013/12/12/claremont-square-harry-potter-caught-outside-number-12-grimmauld-place/

Notes and references
Notes

Citations

Parks and open spaces in the London Borough of Islington
Squares in the London Borough of Islington